Kārlis Irbītis (October 14, 1904, Lāde parish, Governorate of Livonia – October 13, 1997, Saint-Laurent, Quebec, Canada) was a Latvian aeroplane designer.

His greatest successes, for the VEF Factory, were the sports plane VEF I-12 (1935) and the monoplane VEF I-16 (1939), used as a fighter. After World War II, when he had emigrated to Canada, he was the designer of the experimental Canadian vertical landing and take-off aeroplane, the CL-84 (1950).

Aircraft Designed by Kārlis Irbītis 

 Irbītis I-1 Sprīdītis – sport, single-seat / Nikolajs Pūliņš & Kārlis Irbītis (P.2, I.1) 1925
 Irbītis I-2 Ikars / N. Pūliņš & K. Irbītis (P.3, I.2)
 Irbītis I-3 – by Herberts Runka
 Irbītis I-4 Vanadziņš / A.S. ″Christine Backman″
 Irbītis I-5 Ikars II – trainer 2-seat by Nikolajs Pūliņš
 Irbītis I-6 Gambija – trainer single-seat by Nikolajs Pūliņš
 Irbītis I-7 Zilais Putns – trainer single-seat by Nikolajs Pūliņš
 Irbītis I-8 Zilais Putns II – trainer 2-seat / Nikolajs Pūliņš & Kārlis Irbītis 
 Irbītis I-9 Kaija – monoplane / Valsts Daugavpils Arodskola
 Irbītis I-10 Vanags – by Riga Aviation Club / Valsts Daugavpils Arodskola 1935
VEF Factory 
 Irbītis VEF I-11 – sport (low-wing distance racer)
 Irbītis VEF I-12 – trainer 2-seat, converted to single-seater
 Irbītis VEF I-14 – sport (low-wing racer)
 Irbītis VEF I-15a – trainer military single-seat
 Irbītis VEF I-15b – bomber
 Irbītis VEF I-16 – fighter
 Irbītis VEF I-17-1 – trainer military 2-seat
 Irbītis VEF I-17-2 – trainer military 2-seat (engine Shvetsov M-11)
 Irbītis VEF I-18 – sport trainer by Latvia Aeroclub
 Irbītis VEF I-19 – fighter project
Other
 CL-84 – world's first successful tilt-wing aircraft / Canadair 1965

References

External links 
 Latvian Academy of Sciences: Inventors of Latvia — Karl Irbitis 
 

1904 births
1997 deaths
People from Limbaži Municipality
People from Kreis Wolmar
Aircraft designers
20th-century Latvian inventors
20th-century Canadian inventors
Latvian World War II refugees
Latvian emigrants to Canada